The German torpedo boat T22 was one of fifteen Type 39 torpedo boats built for the Kriegsmarine (German Navy) during World War II. Completed in early 1942, the ship was transferred to France later that year where she escorted blockade runners and Axis submarines through the Bay of Biscay. T22 also laid minefields in the English Channel in mid-1943. She participated in the Battle of Sept-Îles, where she crippled a British destroyer, and the Battle of the Bay of Biscay later that year. After returning to Germany in early 1944, T22 struck a pair of mines in Narva Bay in August and blew up, with the loss of 143 men.

Design and description

The Type 39 torpedo boat was conceived as a general-purpose design, much larger than preceding German torpedo boats. Their crew numbered 206 officers and sailors. The Type 39s were fitted with a pair of geared steam turbine sets, each driving one propeller, using steam from four high-pressure water-tube boilers.

As built, the Type 39 ships mounted four  SK C/32 guns in single mounts protected by gun shields; one forward of the superstructure, one between the funnels, and two aft, one superfiring over the other. Anti-aircraft defense was provided by four  SK C/30 AA guns in two twin-gun mounts on platforms abaft the rear funnel, six  C/38 guns in one quadruple mount on the aft superstructure and a pair of single mounts on the bridge wings. They carried six above-water  torpedo tubes in two triple mounts amidships and could also carry 30 mines; the full complement of 60 mines made the ships top-heavy which could be dangerous in bad weather. For anti-submarine work the ships were fitted with a S-Gerät sonar and four depth charge launchers. The Type 39s were equipped with a FuMO 21 radar. In January–February 1944 the single 2 cm mounts in the bridge wings were replaced by quadruple mounts and FuMB7 "Naxos" and FuMB8 "Wanz G" radar detectors were installed.

Construction and career
Originally ordered as a Type 37 torpedo boat on 30 March 1939, T22 was reordered on 10 November 1939 from Schichau. She was built at their Elbing, East Prussia, shipyard as yard number 1481, launched in 1941 and commissioned on 28 February 1942. Later that month T22 was transferred to France. T22, her sister , and Falke and Kondor escorted the Italian blockade runner  from Bordeaux through the Bay of Biscay on 29–30 November. On 5–8 May, the 2nd Torpedo Boat Flotilla with T22, T2, T5, and T23  laid three minefields in the Channel. Now assigned to the 5th Torpedo Boat Flotilla, T22, Kondor, Falke,  and  laid two more minefields in the Channel on 4–6 June.

The following month the ships returned to the Bay of Biscay to help escort U-boats through the Bay as part of the 4th Torpedo Boat Flotilla. From 29 to 31 August, the same three ships escorted the  through the Bay to Lorient. While providing distant cover for a small convoy during the night of 3/4 October, the 4th Flotilla spotted a force of five British destroyers off the Sept-Îles near the coast of Brittany in the Channel and attacked with complete surprise. The first volley of five torpedoes all missed, but the British did not see them and continued on their course. Only when T23 turned on her radar to determine the range for a second volley did they react when one of the British destroyers detected the radar; they altered course just in time for all six of T22s torpedoes to miss. Two of the British ships were able to pursue the retreating Germans at high speed, but both were damaged by German gunfire and forced to disengage.

Battle of Sept-Îles

T22s hydrophones detected the British ships off the Sept-Îles at 00:25 and Korvettenkapitän Franz Kohlauf maneuvered his flotilla to intercept them before they could reach Münsterland. Limbourne overheard the radio transmissions about 01:20 as the German ships turned and alerted the other British ships. About this time, the Germans spotted Charybdis silhouetted against the lighter horizon and Kohlauf ordered every ship to fire all of their torpedoes. Two of these struck the cruiser, which sank shortly afterwards, and one of T22s torpedoes blew the bow off Limbourne, which had to be scuttled later. The loss of the flagship threw the British into confusion as they had not worked together before the attack, and the torpedo boats successfully disengaged before the senior surviving British captain realized that he was in command.

Battle of the Bay of Biscay

On 24–26 December T22 was one of the escorts for the  blockade runner  through the Bay of Biscay. Another blockade runner, the  refrigerated cargo ship , trailed Osorno by several days and four destroyers of the 8th Destroyer Flotilla and the six torpedo boats of the 4th Flotilla set sail on 27 December to escort her through the Bay. The Allies were aware of these blockade runners through their Ultra code-breaking efforts and positioned cruisers and aircraft in the Western Atlantic to intercept them in Operation Stonewall. A Consolidated B-24 Liberator heavy bomber from No. 311 Squadron RAF sank Alsterufer later that afternoon.

The German ships were unaware of the sinking until the following afternoon and continued onward to the rendezvous point. By this time, the weather had gotten significantly worse and the German ships were steaming for home, hampered by the rough seas that threw sea spray over their forward guns which made their operation difficult. It also severely reduced visibility and hampered the rangefinders and sights for the guns and torpedoes.

At about that time, the torpedo boats began firing back with guns and torpedoes; the latter all missed but one hit was made on Glasgows forward boiler room at 14:05, killing two sailors manning the port QF 2-pounder naval gun and wounding six others. The cruisers pursued them with Enterprise crippling Z27 and Glasgow doing the same to T25 and then T26. T22 attempted to close with T25 so she could take off the latter's crew and fired all of her torpedoes and guns at Glasgow at 14:58 in an attempt to drive the cruiser off, but all of the torpedoes missed and her gunfire was ineffective. Shell splashes from Glasgow surrounded T22 and she laid a smoke screen as she was forced to turn away. The ship later encountered Z23 and the two arrived at Saint-Jean-de-Luz, close to the Spanish border, later that day.

Loss 
In early February 1944, T22 and T23 returned to Germany via the Channel and T22 began a refit at Elbing that lasted until June. The ship was then assigned to the 6th Torpedo Boat Flotilla operating in the Baltic. Reinforced by T23 from the 5th Torpedo Boat Flotilla, the ships loaded 54 mines each in Helsinki, Finland, and departed on the evening of the 17th. Shortly after midnight, they started to lay their mines, but had only just begun when T30 struck a pair of mines about 00:25 which knocked out all electrical power. About a minute after that, T32 also struck a pair of mines that blew her bow off and disabled her engines. At 00:30 T30 exploded and broke in half, probably after hitting another mine.

Notes

Citations

References

Further reading

External links
 T22 at german navy.de

Ships built by Schichau
Ships built in Elbing
Type 39 torpedo boats
Maritime incidents in April 1944
1941 ships